Fa Zheng (176–220), courtesy name Xiaozhi, was a key adviser to the warlord Liu Bei in the late Eastern Han dynasty. Born in a family of high social status and of noble descent, Fa Zheng travelled to Yi Province (covering present-day Sichuan and Chongqing) in the late 190s and became a subordinate of Liu Zhang, the provincial governor. However, his feelings of alienation and perception of Liu Zhang as an incompetent governor eventually led him to betray Liu Zhang and defect to Liu Bei in 211. Between 211 and 214, Fa Zheng assisted Liu Bei in overcoming Liu Zhang and seizing control of Yi Province, and became one of Liu Bei's most trusted advisers. In 217, he urged Liu Bei to launch the Hanzhong Campaign to capture the strategic Hanzhong Commandery from a rival warlord, Cao Cao, but died a year after Liu emerged victorious in the campaign.

Fa Zheng's keen foresight and brilliance in formulating strategies earned him praise from his contemporaries such as Zhuge Liang and Chen Shou. In less than a decade serving under Liu, Fa showed a near unmatched sense of timing where military geniuses like Cao Cao and his best advisers fell victim to his schemes. However, he was also notorious for his vindictive personality. When he held office, he abused his power by taking revenge against those who had offended him before, and by killing them without reason. Nevertheless, he was still highly regarded and trusted by Liu Bei – to the point where Zhuge Liang once said that Fa Zheng might have been the only person capable of preventing Liu Bei's defeat at the Battle of Xiaoting in 221 if he were still alive.

Family background
Fa Zheng's ancestral home was in Mei County, Youfufeng Commandery, which is in present-day Mei County, Shaanxi. His ancestor was Tian Fazhang, who is historically known as King Xiang of the Qi state in the Warring States period. Tian Fazhang's descendants changed their family name from "Tian" to "Fa" after the fall of Qi in 221 BCE.

Fa Zheng's great-grandfather, Fa Xiong, served as the Administrator of Nan Commandery (南郡; around present-day Jingzhou, Hubei) during the reign of Emperor An in the Eastern Han dynasty. Fa Zheng's grandfather, Fa Zhen, was a reclusive scholar known for his lofty character; despite being a learned scholar, he led a humble life and repeatedly rejected offers to serve in the government. Fa Zheng's father, Fa Yan, whose courtesy name was Jimou, also served as a government official and held the positions of an assistant to the Excellency over the Masses and the Minister of Justice.

Service under Liu Zhang
In the early Jian'an era (196–220) of the reign of Emperor Xian, when famines broke out, Fa Zheng and his friend Meng Da travelled to Yi Province (covering present-day Sichuan and Chongqing) to join the provincial governor, Liu Zhang. Although Fa Zheng served as the Prefect of Xindu County and later as a Colonel Who Advises the Army under Liu Zhang, he felt alienated because he didn't hold any important appointments therefore couldn't make any significant achievements in his career under Liu Zhang. Besides, some of his fellows from Youfufeng, who had also moved to Yi Province, spoke ill of him in front of Liu Zhang. He maintained a close friendship with his colleague Zhang Song, who shared the same views as him about Liu Zhang being an incompetent and incapable governor.

In 208, Zhang Song travelled to Jing Province (covering present-day Hubei and Hunan) to meet the warlord Cao Cao, who controlled the Han central government and the figurehead Emperor Xian. After returning to Yi Province, Zhang Song advised Liu Zhang to break ties with Cao Cao and build friendly relations with another warlord, Liu Bei. When Zhang Song recommended Fa Zheng to be Liu Zhang's representative to meet Liu Bei, Fa initially refused to accept the task but eventually relented. When Fa Zheng returned from his mission, he told Zhang Song that Liu Bei had grand ambitions and persuaded Zhang to follow him to serve Liu Bei.

Their opportunity came in 211, when Liu Zhang became fearful upon receiving news that Cao Cao was planning to attack the warlord Zhang Lu in Hanzhong Commandery. As Hanzhong Commandery was located strategically at the northern route leading into Yi Province, Liu Zhang would be in great peril if Hanzhong fell into Cao Cao's hands. Zhang Song proposed to Liu Zhang to invite Liu Bei to Yi Province to assist them in countering the threat posed by Cao Cao. Liu Zhang agreed and sent Fa Zheng as his envoy to contact Liu Bei. When Fa Zheng met Liu Bei, he secretly told him, "General, with your brilliance, you can overcome our incompetent and weak Governor Liu. Zhang Song, as a trusted adviser (of Liu Zhang), will serve as your spy. Upon acquiring Yi Province's wealth and resources, and having its natural barriers as protection, you can easily realise your grand ambitions." Fa Zheng also saw Liu Bei's marital problems and advised him to have Lady Sun sent back to Wu. Liu Bei accepted Fa Zheng's former advice and led his forces into Yi Province, where he met Liu Zhang at Fu County (涪縣; present-day Fucheng District, Mianyang, Sichuan). Liu Bei then led his troops north to Jiameng (葭萌; located about 20 km northeast of present-day Jiange County, Sichuan) before turning south to attack Liu Zhang later.

Helping Liu Bei seize Yi Province from Liu Zhang

Upon receiving news of Liu Bei's attack, Zheng Du, an assistant officer from Guanghan Commandery (廣漢郡; around present-day Guanghan, Sichuan) serving under Liu Zhang, pointed out to his lord that Liu Bei's army lacked supplies and was composed of newly recruited soldiers who might not be loyal to him. He suggested that Liu Zhang adopt a scorched earth policy against Liu Bei by forcing the residents of Baxi and Zitong commanderies to relocate elsewhere and destroy all the granaries and supply depots in the commanderies, and then fortify their defences while avoiding direct conflict with Liu Bei. He claimed that if this strategy was implemented, Liu Bei would run out of supplies within 100 days and retreat, and then Liu Zhang could attack him while he was retreating. Liu Bei felt frustrated when he heard about Zheng Du's plan and consulted Fa Zheng about it. Fa Zheng predicted that Liu Zhang would not heed Zheng Du's suggestion and was proven right: In response to Zheng Du's plan, Liu Zhang not only rejected it on the grounds that it would cause disturbance to the people, but also dismissed Zheng from office.

In 214, when Liu Bei's army surrounded Luocheng, one of Liu Zhang's strongholds, Fa Zheng wrote a long letter to his former lord, pointing out that Liu Zhang was already in a highly disadvantageous position and urging him to give up resistance and surrender to Liu Bei.

Fa Zheng's letter was written as such: 

Later that year, when Liu Bei's forces was besieging Yi Province's capital Chengdu, Xu Jing, a commandery Administrator serving under Liu Zhang, planned to surrender and defect to Liu Bei, but his plan was leaked out and hence aborted. Liu Zhang felt that he was already at the brink of destruction so he did not punish Xu Jing. He eventually surrendered and relinquished his control of Yi Province to Liu Bei. After taking over Yi Province, Liu Bei treated Xu Jing coldly because he felt that Xu was a disloyal person. Fa Zheng advised him, "Xu Jing is someone with an exaggerated reputation. However, my lord, you've recently built your foundation and you can't possibly explain the facts to everyone. Xu Jing's name is already well known throughout the Empire. If you don't treat him respectfully, others might think that you're belittling talented and virtuous people. You should honour and respect him, and make this known to everyone, just like how the King of Yan treated Guo Wei (郭隗)." Liu Bei followed Fa Zheng's advice and treated Xu Jing generously.

Sun Sheng criticizes Fa Zheng for his advice and the comparison between Guo Wei and Xu Jing : 

Pei Songzhi completely disagrees with Sun Sheng's opinion:

Service under Liu Bei

Becoming Liu Bei's Chief Adviser
Liu Bei appointed Fa Zheng as the Administrator of Shu Commandery and General Who Spreads Martial Might. Fa Zheng oversaw administrative affairs in the vicinity of Yi Province's capital Chengdu. While Zhuge Liang was promoted to administer internal affairs, Fa Zheng served as Liu Bei's chief adviser.

Following Liu Bei's victory over Liu Zhang, his subordinates urged him to take for wife Liu Mao's widow. However Liu Bei refused on the basics that him and Liu Mao were of the same family. Fa Zheng then to convince him said: "In the ancien times, lady Huai Ying first married the Duke Huai of Jin and later married his own brother, the Duke Wen of Jin. If the marriage of a widow between brothers happened by the past then why not for you and Liu Mao who are not close kinsman?" Liu Bei agreed with him and married Lady Wu.

During this period of time, Fa Zheng repaid all of his previous debts, good or bad. He would not forget those who showed him even a little kindness but also abused his power by taking revenge against those who offended him before, and by killing them without reason. Some officials approached Zhuge Liang, another of Liu Bei's key advisers, and urged him to report Fa Zheng's lawless behaviour to their lord and take action against him. However, Zhuge Liang replied, "When our lord was in Gong'an, he was wary of Cao Cao's influence in the north and fearful of Sun Quan's presence in the east. Even in home territory he was afraid that Lady Sun might stir up trouble. He was in such a difficult situation at the time that he could neither advance nor retreat. Fa Xiaozhi supported and helped him so much that he became his own wings (翼), such that he is now able to fly high and no longer remain under others' influence. How can we stop Fa Zheng from behaving as he wishes?" Zhuge Liang was aware that Liu Bei favoured and trusted Fa Zheng, which was why he refused to intervene in this matter.

The historian Sun Sheng criticised Zhuge Liang's attitude towards Fa Zheng's abuse of power and called it a "lapse in justice". He felt that no subject should be above the law, regardless of how great his past contributions were.

Tang Geng (唐庚), a scholar from the Song dynasty in his work called the "Three Kingdoms Miscellaneous Cases" (三國雜事) compared Fa Zheng to Fan Ju (范雎), Li Guang and Guo Jin (郭進). The three of them were allowed to settle their personal grudges and rendered great achievements for their States. Tang Geng stated that this is how rulers of the past made use of their oustanding and heroic individuals. That they had their own conceptions of righteousness. Tang Geng called Sun Sheng shortsighted for not seeing this.

Role in the Hanzhong Campaign

In 217, Fa Zheng urged Liu Bei to attack Hanzhong Commandery, which was originally under Zhang Lu's control but was conquered by Cao Cao in 215. He pointed out Hanzhong's strategic importance and said that it was an opportune moment for Liu Bei to seize Hanzhong from Cao Cao's generals Xiahou Yuan and Zhang He. He told Liu Bei: "Cao Cao with a single strike was able to submit Zhang Lu into surrender and acquire Hanzhong however he did not press his advantage to conquer Ba and Shu. Instead he returned North and left Xiahou Yuan and Zhang He. This cannot be a error of his part or because of a lack of strengh but rather because he met some internal problems and must solve them. Now Xiahou Yuan and Zhang He can't compare against our army. If we advance, we will surely capture them. Then we can collect grains, fill our storehouse readying ourselves for any opportunities. If we are successful we can vanquish the ennemy and restore the ruling House otherwise we can expand our borders into the Liang province and in any case we would have gain a most important position to defend and prepare ourselves. Heaven is on our side, you must not lose this chance." Liu Bei accepted his plan and started the Hanzhong Campaign with Fa Zheng following him.   

In 219, during the Battle of Mount Dingjun, when Xiahou Yuan led troops to attack Liu Bei's camps at Dingjun and Xingshi mountains, Fa Zheng suggested Liu Bei to strike the enemy. Liu Bei ordered his general Huang Zhong to lead his men on a charge down the mountain towards Xiahou Yuan's forces, with war drums beating in the background. Huang Zhong defeated and killed Xiahou Yuan in the midst of battle.

Later, when Cao Cao was leading his forces from Chang'an to reinforce Hanzhong, he received news about the strategy proposed by Fa Zheng to Liu Bei to attack Hanzhong. He remarked, "I know Xuande (Liu Bei) is not capable of doing this. He must be following somebody's advice." Moreover, Cao Cao also said: "How could it be that among my army of bold heroes, none could find a strategy that would overcome this Fa Zheng?" The historian Pei Songzhi commented that Cao Cao made that former remark – which suggests that Liu Bei was not wise enough to notice Hanzhong's strategic importance – because of his personal disdain for Liu, and that it should not be taken seriously. He felt that a lord acting on his adviser's suggestion should not be interpreted as a sign that the lord was not wise enough to make his own judgment. He pointed out that Cao Cao himself also followed the advice of his adviser Guo Jia.

Death and postmortem events
In 219, after Liu Bei emerged victorious in the Hanzhong Campaign, he declared himself "King of Hanzhong" and appointed Fa Zheng as the Prefect of the Masters of Writing and General Who Protects the Army. Fa Zheng died in the following year at the age of 45 (by East Asian age reckoning). Liu Bei cried for days when Fa Zheng died and awarded Fa the posthumous title "Marquis Yi", which literally means "marquis of the flank". Alone, the Yi (翼) word/title is more commonly translated as "wing". Therefore, Fa's posthumous title can also be translated as "marquis of the wing". During Liu Bei's short reign, many of his long term companions and famous generals had passed away. Among them were Guan Yu, Zhang Fei, Ma Chao, Pang Tong and Huang Zhong yet Fa Zheng was the only one to receive a posthumous title. Such was the extent to which Liu Bei valued Fa Zheng. Fa Zheng's son, Fa Miao, received the title of a Secondary Marquis and served as a Commandant of Equipage and the Administrator of Hanyang Commandery in the state of Shu Han, which Liu Bei established in 221.

Fa Zheng and Zhuge Liang did not share the same moral beliefs but they had a good working relationship because of their common goal, which was to serve Liu Bei well. Zhuge Liang was very impressed with Fa Zheng's brilliance. In 221, before the Battle of Xiaoting, many of Liu Bei's subjects advised their lord against going to war with his former ally, Sun Quan, who seized Jing Province from Liu in 219 and executed Liu's general Guan Yu. Liu Bei ignored them and proceeded with his campaign against Sun Quan. In the following year, he lost to Sun Quan's forces at the Battle of Xiaoting and had to retreat to Baidicheng, where he died in 223. Zhuge Liang sighed, "If Fa Xiaozhi was still alive, he could have prevented our lord from going on this eastern campaign; even if our lord did go on this campaign, he wouldn't have ended up in this disastrous situation (if Fa Xiaozhi was with him)."

Zhuge Liang might be right about Fa Zheng, as inferred from an incident during the Hanzhong Campaign. During one battle, when the odds turned against Liu Bei, Liu's subjects urged their lord to retreat but he stubbornly refused. They did not dare to advise him again for fear of incurring his wrath. Fa Zheng rushed forth and stood in front of Liu Bei when Cao Cao's forces rained arrows on their camp. Liu Bei told Fa Zheng to stay under cover to avoid the arrows, but Fa insisted on braving the arrows with his lord. Liu Bei then decided to retreat together with Fa Zheng.

Appraisal
Chen Shou, who wrote Fa Zheng's biography in the Sanguozhi, appraised Fa as follows: "Fa Zheng clearly foresaw success and failure. Therefore, he had talent for all sort of unusual tactics and strategies. However, he was not known to be of good moral character. In comparison with officials from (Cao) Wei, if Pang Tong was akin to Xun Yu and Xun You then Fa Zheng should be comparable to Cheng (Yu) and Guo (Jia)."

Yang Xi wrote an appraisal on Fa Zheng as follows: "The Marquis Yi was talented for stratagem, could anticipate both rise and decline of the world. Entrusted with the foundation by his Lord, he answered with correct instruction and counsel. With a swift thought he managed his calculation, would observe the situation and perceive the opportunity."

In popular culture

Fa Zheng became a playable character in Koei's Dynasty Warriors 8: Xtreme Legends.

See also
 Lists of people of the Three Kingdoms

Notes

References

Citations from the Sanguozhi

Citations from the Sanguozhi zhu

Other citations

Bibliography
 Chen, Shou (3rd century). Records of the Three Kingdoms (Sanguozhi).
 Chang Qu (4th century). Chronicles of Huayang (Huayang Guo Zhi).
 Pei, Songzhi (5th century). Annotations to Records of the Three Kingdoms (Sanguozhi zhu).
Fan, Ye (5th century). Book of the Later Han (Houhanshu).
Sima, Guang (1084). Zizhi Tongjian.

176 births
220 deaths
Liu Zhang and associates
Officials under Liu Bei
Generals under Liu Bei
Politicians from Baoji
Political office-holders in Sichuan
Han dynasty politicians from Shaanxi
Han dynasty generals from Shaanxi